Daniel Chadwick (January 5, 1825 – November 23, 1884) was an American politician. He served in Connecticut's House and Senate. He was also a state attorney in Connecticut. He was a Republican.

Chadwick, son of Daniel and Nancy (Waite) Chadwick, was born in Lyme, Connecticut January 5, 1825.

He graduated from Yale College in 1845. After graduation he studied law in Lyme with his uncle, the Hon. Henry M. Waite, and for one year with his cousin, Morrison Waite (future Chief Justice of the United States).  He was admitted to the bar in 1847, and at once began the practice of law in Lyme. He continued there until 1854  when he removed to Baltimore. Two years later his father's death recalled him to Lyme, where he continued the practice of his profession.

He served as a member of the Connecticut State Senate in 1858, and of the Connecticut House of Representatives in 1859, and again as a member of the State Senate in 1864, being thus twice ex officio a fellow of Yale College. He was State's attorney for New London County from 1861 to 1876, and from 1880 till his death United States Attorney for the District of Connecticut. He died very suddenly at his home in Lyme, November 23, 1884, in his 60th year.

Family
Chadwick married Ellen Hayes on March 21, 1848. She was the third daughter of Enoch Hayes of Lyme who outlived. He had two sons and two daughters, one of whom preceded Chadwick in death.

References

External links

1825 births
1884 deaths
People from Lyme, Connecticut
Connecticut lawyers
Yale College alumni
Connecticut state senators
Members of the Connecticut House of Representatives
United States Attorneys for the District of Connecticut
19th-century American politicians
19th-century American lawyers